Suurupi Peninsula is peninsula in Harju County, Estonia.

Objects on peninsula: Ninamaa Cape.

Several villages are located on peninsula: Muraste, Suurupi and Viti.

Part of peninsula is under protection (Muraste Nature Reserve).

References

Peninsulas of Estonia
Harju County